Schinia errans is a moth of the family Noctuidae. It is found in North America, including Arizona.

The wingspan is about 22 mm.

The larvae feed on Machaeranthera tanacetifolia.

External links
Images
Bug Guide

Schinia
Moths of North America
Moths described in 1883